Genesis Lourdes Rodriguez Gomez (born 17 July 1994) is a Venezuelan weightlifter, competing in the 53 kg category and representing Venezuela at international competitions.

She competed at world championships, including at the 2015 World Weightlifting Championships.

She won the silver medal in her event at the 2022 South American Games held in Asunción, Paraguay.

Major results

References

External links

1994 births
Living people
Venezuelan female weightlifters
Place of birth missing (living people)
Weightlifters at the 2010 Summer Youth Olympics
Weightlifters at the 2015 Pan American Games
Pan American Games medalists in weightlifting
Pan American Games gold medalists for Venezuela
Pan American Games silver medalists for Venezuela
Weightlifters at the 2019 Pan American Games
Medalists at the 2015 Pan American Games
Medalists at the 2019 Pan American Games
Pan American Weightlifting Championships medalists
21st-century Venezuelan women
South American Games silver medalists for Venezuela
South American Games medalists in weightlifting
Competitors at the 2022 South American Games